Aluç can refer to:

 Aluç, Bismil
 Aluç, İskilip